Oliveira may refer to:

People
 Oliveira (surname), which includes D'Oliveira
 Oliveira (footballer, born 1981), full name Ederaldo Antonio de Oliveira, Brazilian football goalkeeper
 Oliveira (footballer, born 1985), full name Bruno Giglio de Oliveira, Brazilian football centre-back

Places

Brazil
 Oliveira, Minas Gerais, a municipality in the State of Minas Gerais
 Sales Oliveira, a municipality in the State of São Paulo

Portugal
 Oliveira (Barcelos), a civil parish in the municipality of Barcelos
 Oliveira (Póvoa de Lanhoso), a civil parish in the municipality of Póvoa de Lanhoso
 Oliveira (Amarante), a civil parish in the municipality of Amarante
 Oliveira (Arcos de Valdevez), a civil parish in the municipality of Arcos de Valdevez
 Oliveira (Mesão Frio), a civil parish in the municipality of Mesão Frio
 Oliveira do Douro (Cinfães), a civil parish in the municipality of Cinfães
 Oliveira do Douro (Vila Nova de Gaia), a civil parish in the municipality of Vila Nova de Gaia
 Oliveira de Azeméis, a civil parish in the municipality of Aveiro
 Oliveira de Frades, a civil parish in the municipality of Viseu
 Oliveira do Bairro, a civil parish in the municipality of Aveiro 
 Oliveira do Hospital, a civil parish in the municipality of Coimbra

Stadiums
 Estádio Alberto Oliveira, multi-use stadium in Feira de Santana, Brazil
 Estádio Ary de Oliveira e Souza, multi-use stadium in Campos dos Goytacazes, Brazil
 Estádio João Hora de Oliveira, multi-use stadium in Aracaju, Brazil
 Estádio Raulino de Oliveira, a football stadium in Volta Redonda, Brazil

Football clubs
 F.C. Oliveira do Hospital, Portuguese football club in Oliveira do Hospital
 Oliveira do Bairro S.C., Portuguese football club in Oliveira do Bairro

Other uses
 Oliveira Elementary School, an elementary school in Fremont, California, USA
 Oliveira-Tanzi effect, an economic situation
 SuperCup Cândido de Oliveira, a football trophy